Ron Phibun Ron Phibun or Ronphibool is a district (amphoe) in the southern part of Nakhon Si Thammarat province, southern Thailand. The district is home to the Phud Hong Leper Colony. As of 2020, it provides a home for 133 leprosy patients.

Geography
Neighboring districts are (from the west clockwise): Thung Song, Lan Saka, Phra Phrom, Chaloem Phra Kiat, Cha-uat, and Chulabhorn of  Nakhon Si Thammarat province.

Administration
The district is divided into six sub-districts (tambons), which are further subdivided into 61 villages (mubans). There are three townships (thesaban tambons). Ron Phibun and Hin Tok both covers parts of the same-named tambons, and Khao Chum Thong covers the whole tambon Khuan Koei. There are a further six tambon administrative organizations (TAO).

References

External links
amphoe.com

Districts of Nakhon Si Thammarat province